Charles Cardoza Poindexter (March 10, 1880 – June 3, 1913) was a professor at Fisk University. Poindexter was also known for being the founder of Alpha Phi Alpha Society which became Alpha Phi Alpha Fraternity, Incorporated.

Early life 
Poindexter was born in Pennsboro, West Virginia, on March 10, 1880. He attended high school at the West Virginia Colored Institute (present-day West Virginia State University), graduating in 1896, and returned for a vocational degree. Poindexter attended Ohio State University from 1899 to 1903 earning a B.Sci in Agriculture. In 1903, he wrote "The Development of the Spikelet and Grain of Corn." Poindexter was said to be a very superior Negro, very light in color.  From Ohio State, he attended a graduate program at Cornell University from 1905 to 1907.

Poindexter married Helen Florence Newton on March 31, 1906, and while at Cornell, Poindexter wrote about the student experiences in the school.  Poindexter served as secretary to Thomas Forsyth Hunt, who authored How to Choose a Farm: With a Discussion of American Lands, as well as The Cereals of America.  He would serve as a Virginia delegate to the Association of American Agricultural Colleges and Experiment Stations Convention.

Alpha Phi Alpha 
After graduation and while at Cornell as a graduate student in the College of Agriculture, Poindexter was the organizer of a group of literary students at Cornell University. The group initially consisted of 15 students and included females. The group met every two weeks at 421 North Albany Street, where Poindexter roomed. Poindexter felt the group should serve the cultural and social needs of the black community and not be an elite secret society.

Poindexter was the first President of Alpha Phi Alpha Society. He was stated to have a faculty relationship with the students of the group because he was the secretary of one of the professors. In December 1905, Poindexter organized a meeting of students which included Murray, Ogle,  Morgan T. Phillips, Chapman, Kelley, Callis, Tompkins, and Tandy. In March 1906, the name Alpha Phi Alpha was introduced. Poindexter became the first President of Alpha Phi Alpha. Under the leadership of Poindexter the first banquet, initiation procedures, and policies were introduced. A vote again confirmed the name Alpha Phi Alpha with the colors of old gold and black. The initiation of new members took place on October 30, 1906 at a Masonic Hall including  Eugene Kinckle Jones, Lemuel Graves and Gordon Jones. James Morton was considered and selected but at the time was not registered at the university.  It was felt that Poindexter being a graduate student dominated the meetings of Alpha Phi Alpha.  His leadership was significant during the early stages of the organization.  In his absence at a meeting the fraternity idea was pushed for a vote by Murray and was seconded by Robert H Ogle.

In December 1906, the resignation of Thompson was accepted. Seven of the original 12 men from the initial meeting would continue on as members of the fraternity.  In Dec 1906, Poindexter submitted a letter of resignation, but the letter was held for a month due to the message being unclear. Poindexter would effectively remove himself from the organization after this period.  One month later, in January 1907, Poindexter resigned from the fraternity when he took a new job in Hampton, Virginia. This job was as an assistant agriculturist.

Despite Poindexter's role in the formation of Alpha Phi Alpha, it was agreed that his name would not be linked to the early formation of the fraternity by the Jewels of Alpha Phi Alpha. This view was emphatic especially from Nathanial Murray. The term used for Poindexter as agreed by members of the fraternity was Precursor. Euguene Kinkle Jones who joined the group in October 1906 was given the title of a founder in 1952, while James Morton was removed because he was not a member of the school.

Fisk University 
At Fisk University, Poindexter served as the  Professor of the Agriculture Department and Biology. While there he implemented programs such as the annual spring day celebration.  Among his botany students was Alpha Phi Alpha historian Charles H. Wesley. Poindexter died on June 3, 1913 as a result of complications from surgery.

References 

1880 births
1913 deaths
Academics from West Virginia
African-American academics
Agriculture educators
Alpha Phi Alpha founders
Alpha Phi Alpha presidents
American agriculturalists
Cornell University alumni
Educators from West Virginia
Fisk University faculty
Ohio State University College of Food, Agricultural, and Environmental Sciences alumni
People from Pennsboro, West Virginia
West Virginia State University alumni